Charles Kenney Duncan (December 7, 1911 – June 27, 1994) was a United States Navy four star admiral who served as Supreme Allied Commander Atlantic/Commander in Chief, United States Atlantic Command/Commander in Chief, U.S. Atlantic Fleet (SACLANT/CINCLANT/CINCLANTFLT) from 1970 to 1972.

Military career
Duncan was born on December 7, 1911 in Nicholasville, Kentucky. At the age of nine his mother became a full professor at the University of Kentucky, and the family moved to Lexington, where he  attended University High School, Kavanaugh Preparatory School, and the University of Kentucky before entering the United States Naval Academy. During his tenure he met Sheila Taylor of Halifax, Nova Scotia, whom he married in the summer of 1941 in Bermuda.

In 1942 he was the first executive officer of the destroyer , which proceeded from the Atlantic to the Pacific, taking part in combat in the Aleutians and the South Pacific. During this time he was awarded two Navy Commendation medals with Combat "V." Towards the end of the war he was assigned as Director of Naval Officer Procurement, Bureau of Naval Personnel, a position he held from 1944 to 1946.

Following World War II, he served in various capacities such as Executive Assistant to the Chief of Naval Personnel 1953 to 1955, a battleship executive officer, commanding an amphibious ship and a destroyer division, and as operations officer of the U.S. Pacific Fleet. He also served on the Holloway Board whose mission was to "study the form, system, and method of education of Naval officers." The outcome of the board was the establishment of modern Naval ROTC and direct commissions for college graduates from Officer Candidate School.

Duncan was promoted to flag rank in the summer of 1958, and concurrently assigned Commander, Amphibious Group One from 1958 to 1959, followed by Commander, Amphibious Training Command, Pacific Fleet from 1959 to 1961. He took command of U.S. Naval Base Subic Bay in January 1961, During his tenure he served as president of a Philippine charity and vice president of the Philippines Tubercular Association.

After a stint as Assistant Chief of Naval Personnel for Plans and Programs from 1962 to 1964, he turned to command, as Commander, Atlantic Fleet Cruiser-Destroyer Force from 1964 to 1965, then commanded the United States Second Fleet and NATO's Striking Fleet Atlantic and the Atlantic Fleet Amphibious Force. During this time he was promoted to vice admiral. He was awarded the Legion of Merit for "exceptionally meritorious service" while Commander Amphibious Force, U.S. Atlantic Fleet, from June 1965 to May 1967.

Duncan became Deputy Chief of Naval Operations (Manpower and Naval Reserve) and the Chief of Naval Personnel, serving in that capacity from April 1968 to August 1970, before becoming the seventh NATO Supreme Allied Commander Atlantic on September 30, 1970, and concurrently Commander in Chief Atlantic (the United States Unified Command) and the Commander in Chief of the U.S. Atlantic Fleet. As Supreme Allied Commander, Atlantic, he conducted the largest NATO naval exercises held until that time. He received the Order of Orange-Nassau from the Netherlands, and the Grand Cross of the Order of Aviz from Portugal. He retired from the U.S. Navy on November 1, 1972 as a full admiral.

Post-military career
After retiring, he lived near Leesburg, Virginia until January 1977, continuing to serve as a member of the Secretary of the Navy's Advisory Board on Education and Training, and as a member of the Board of Advisors to the President, U.S. Naval War College in Newport, Rhode Island. He eventually moved to Coronado, California.

He became a member of the Board of Trustees of the San Diego Museum of Art in 1981, and in 1984, he was elected as a member of France's Académie de Marine and also was named a Kentucky colonel. He died of cancer on June 27, 1994, at the Scripps Clinic in La Jolla, California.

See also

References

United States Navy admirals
United States Naval Academy alumni
United States Navy personnel of World War II
1911 births
1994 deaths
Military personnel from Lexington, Kentucky

Recipients of the Navy Distinguished Service Medal
Recipients of the Legion of Merit
Knights Grand Cross of the Order of Orange-Nassau
Grand Crosses of the Order of Aviz
Deaths from cancer in California
People from Leesburg, Virginia